"Boshret Kheir", is an Egyptian-folk song performed by Emirati singer Hussain Al Jassmi dedicated from him to Egypt and was released on May 16, 2014, showing clips of Egyptians dancing in different areas of the country, in an effort to unite them and convince them to vote. Most of the Egyptians depicted hold up posters with phrases such as "vote", "get out there", and "your voice counts". The video was filmed in eight Egyptian provinces by eight different cameras and was put together in less than a day. The creator of the song, Ayman Qamar, planned on singing it himself but found out that Al Jassmi was coming to Egypt, and offered to sing the song himself to show his love for Egypt.

In July 2013, the Egyptian presidency was vacated following the removal from office of the president Mohamed Morsi after protests, after only a single year in power. Despite claims from the ousted Muslim Brotherhood indicating that Egyptians did not participate in large numbers in the subsequent 2014 elections, independent reports indicate that 47.14% of eligible voters participated in the ballot; this is comparable to the 49.62% who turned out in the 2012 election that elevated Mohammed Morsi to power.

Video
On May 16, a 3-minute video was published, showing the diversity of the people across Egypt as they dance and hold cards with different Arabic words on them to encourage people to vote. A caption in the video says "Dedicated to all EGYPTIANS" in English. Al Jasmi himself doesn't appear in the video. When asked why he sang the song, he replied that he wanted to show his great love for the Egyptian People.

Popularity
The video as of 7 February 2021, has received more than 500 million views and has garnered international parodies, mixes, and imitations. The video gained popularity in the Arab world with copies being made about Syria, Lebanon, and Palestine, respectively. There are many videos worldwide from people who dance to the song and post their videos. The video received more than 5 million views on the day of its release, and was ranked among the top 100 songs internationally. In a televised speech, Qamar said that the song took him one day to write and that it took only 48 hours to put together all the pieces and produce the whole video. The video was funded by CBC, a Middle Eastern channel with the rights to the song.

References

External links
 Boshret Kheir - Hussain Al Jassmi

Egyptian songs
2014 YouTube videos
2014 songs